Auguste Courtiller (1795-1875) was a French paleontologist and viticulturist. Muscat de Saumur was first cultivated in 1842 by Auguste Courtiller, who created it by selecting seedlings from a Pinot Noir Précoce vine with open pollination. Courtiller worked in the Jardin des Plantes of the city of Saumur.

As a paleontologist, he described the ammonites species Ammonites cephalotus (syn. of Neoptychites telinga) in 1860 and Kamerunoceras salmuriensis in 1867. He also named the genus Cupulina in 1861.

Works 
 Éponges fossiles des sables du terrain crétacé supérieur des environs de Saumur: étage senonien de d'Orbigny. A Courtiller - 1861
 Catalogue du musée de Saumur. A Courtiller, C Trouillard - 1868

References 

1795 births
1875 deaths
French paleontologists
French viticulturists